Smeets is a Limburgian surname (or more broadly, Dutch surname) meaning smith (metal worker). The surname hails specifically from the Limburg region spanning parts of the Southern Netherlands and Eastern Belgium.

People bearing the Smeets surname
Axel Smeets (b. 1974), Belgian football defender and manager
Bryan Smeets (b. 1992), Dutch football midfielder
Felix Smeets (1904–1961), Dutch football striker
 (b. 1958), Dutchjournalist and historian
Ionica Smeets (b. 1979), Dutch mathematician, science journalist, and TV presenter
Jan Smeets (b. 1985), Dutch chess player
Jorg Smeets (b. 1970), Dutch football midfielder
Jorrit Smeets (b. 1995), Dutch football midfielder
Joseph Smeets (b. 1959), Belgian racing cyclist
Lucian Smeets (fl. 1900), Belgian stamp forger
Mart Smeets (b. 1947), Dutch radio and television personality, writer and columnist
Martine Smeets (b. 1990), Dutch handball player
Minke Smeets (b. 1979), Dutch field hockey player, wife of Tjerk
Pauline Smeets (b. 1959), Dutch Labour Party politician
Robert Smeets (b. 1985), Australian tennis player
 (b. 1964), Dutch jeweler
Tjerk Smeets (b. 1980), Dutch baseball player, son of Mart Smeets, husband of Minke
Michele Rocco Smeets (b. 1984), Belgian actor and game developer, AKA Mike "The Spike" Smith.

See also
Smets, Dutch occupational surname with a different origin

References

Dutch-language surnames
Limburgian surnames
Occupational surnames
Culture of Limburg (Netherlands)